Cnidoscolus angustidens, with the common name mala mujer, is an herbaceous perennial plant in the spurge family (Euphorbiaceae).

It is native to the Sonoran Desert mountains of southeastern Arizona and Northwestern Mexico, and further south in Mexico.

"Mala mujer" is Spanish for "bad woman", referring to its stinging hairs which cause severe contact dermatitis.

Subspecies
 Cnidoscolus angustidens subsp. angustidens - Arizona, Mexico
 Cnidoscolus angustidens subsp. calyculatus (Pax & K.Hoffm.) Breckon ex Fern.Casas - Michoacán
 Cnidoscolus angustidens subsp. dentatus Breckon ex Fern.Casas - Jalisco, Guerrero, Puebla
 Cnidoscolus angustidens subsp. orbiculatus (Lundell) Breckon ex Fern.Casas - C + S Mexico

References

External links
USDA Plants Profile for Cnidoscolus angustidens (mala mujer)

angustidens
Flora of Arizona
Flora of Mexico
Flora of Sonora
Flora of the Sonoran Deserts
Plants described in 1858